Karlovice is a municipality and village in Semily District in the Liberec Region of the Czech Republic. It has about 800 inhabitants.

Administrative parts
Villages of Radvánovice, Roudný, Sedmihorky and Svatoňovice are administrative parts of Karlovice.

References

External links

Villages in Semily District